Scot Walters (born November 18, 1967) is an American stock car racing driver from Cornelius, North Carolina. He competed in NASCAR from 1997 to 1999 in the Craftsman Truck Series, as well as one Busch Series race in 1998.

NASCAR career
Walters, born on November 18, 1967 in Cornelius, North Carolina, began his NASCAR career at Louisville Motor Speedway during the 1997 NASCAR Craftsman Truck Series season. During his first race he finished seventh after starting 13th. He also started two other races during 1997, in which he finished 26th and 29th after failing to finish both. In the season, he failed to qualify for one race, which occurred at I-70 Speedway. One year later he competed in all 27 Craftsman Truck Series events, as well as one Busch Series event. During the 1998 Truck season, he recorded three top tens, and two did not finishes (DNF), with his best finish during the season was eighth at Nashville Speedway. In his first Busch Series event, he finished 43rd after only completing two laps out of 150 at Auto Club Speedway. In 1999, Walters only competed in one Craftsman Truck Series race, which was located at Homestead Miami Speedway. During the race, he finished 20th after completing 152 laps out of 172 because of an engine problem.

Motorsports career results

NASCAR
(key) (Bold - Pole position awarded by qualifying time. Italics - Pole position earned by points standings or practice time. * – Most laps led.)

Busch Series

Camping World Truck Series

References

External links
 

American Speed Association drivers
NASCAR drivers
Living people
1967 births
People from Cornelius, North Carolina
Racing drivers from Charlotte, North Carolina
Racing drivers from North Carolina